Clendon Park is a suburb of Auckland in northern New Zealand. It is located to the west of Manurewa and north of Weymouth. The suburb is in the Manurewa-Papakura ward, one of the 21 local boards of Auckland Council.

History 
Clendon Park is named after Captain James Reddy Clendon who in 1840 traded land he owned in the Bay of Islands with the newly formed New Zealand Government for 10,000 acres (40 km2) of land, then south of Auckland CBD.

The name Clendon Park was chosen in October 1976 by the Manukau City Council.

Clendon Park's first stage of development was at Finlayson Avenue, where the Clendon Park Community House opened in April 1979. The first stage of the Clendon Park Shopping Centre opened in 1984. The development later expanded south to Weymouth.

Demographics

Clendon Park had a population of 8,871 at the 2018 New Zealand census, an increase of 1,077 people (13.8%) since the 2013 census, and an increase of 906 people (11.4%) since the 2006 census. There were 1,986 households, comprising 4,347 males and 4,524 females, giving a sex ratio of 0.96 males per female, with 2,760 people (31.1%) aged under 15 years, 2,337 (26.3%) aged 15 to 29, 3,399 (38.3%) aged 30 to 64, and 381 (4.3%) aged 65 or older.

Ethnicities were 16.6% European/Pākehā, 29.6% Māori, 55.4% Pacific peoples, 16.5% Asian, and 1.8% other ethnicities. People may identify with more than one ethnicity.

The percentage of people born overseas was 34.2, compared with 27.1% nationally.

Although some people chose not to answer the census's question about religious affiliation, 23.4% had no religion, 55.3% were Christian, 4.0% had Māori religious beliefs, 6.9% were Hindu, 3.1% were Muslim, 0.7% were Buddhist and 1.7% had other religions.

Of those at least 15 years old, 522 (8.5%) people had a bachelor's or higher degree, and 1,341 (21.9%) people had no formal qualifications. 330 people (5.4%) earned over $70,000 compared to 17.2% nationally. The employment status of those at least 15 was that 2,946 (48.2%) people were employed full-time, 594 (9.7%) were part-time, and 513 (8.4%) were unemployed.

Education

Clendon Park School opened in 1971. Te Matauranga has some Samoan classes up to year 8.

All these schools are coeducational. Te Kura Kaupapa Māori o Manurewa teaches primarily in the Māori language. All other schools here include classes in Māori and Samoan languages. Rolls are as of

See also
 Manurewa High School

References

External links
Photographs of Clendon Park held in Auckland Libraries' heritage collections.

Suburbs of Auckland
Populated places around the Manukau Harbour